Ando cantandole al viento y no solo por cantar it is the ninth album from Argentine singer Jorge Cafrune, recorded in Argentina in 1965 on the CBS label. Two versions of the album were produced. The contents listed below are from the Uruguayan version.

Track listing 

 "Zamba de tus ojos"  
 "Chacarera de Gualiama"
 "Payo Solá"
 "Corazón alegre"
 "Milonga del solitario" (2)
 "Zamba de los mineros"
 "Zamba de otoño"
 "Linda mi tierra Jujeña"
 "Minero potosino"
 "Vamos a la zafra"
 "Mis changuitos así son"
 "Noche y camino"

References

1965 albums
Jorge Cafrune albums
CBS Records albums
Spanish-language albums